The 1914 Ontario general election was the 14th general election held in the Province of Ontario, Canada.  It was held on June 29, 1914, to elect the 111 Members of the 14th Legislative Assembly of Ontario (MLAs).

The Ontario Conservative Party, led by Sir James P. Whitney, won a fourth consecutive term in government. Whitney died three months after the election and was succeeded by William Howard Hearst. The Conservatives contested 109 of the 111 ridings, deciding not to have candidates stand in Glengarry (where the Liberal Hugh Munro was acclaimed) and Norfolk North (where the Liberal incumbent Thomas Robert Atkinson was up against a Liberal anti-Temperance candidate). However, dissension within the Tory ranks resulted in a significant number of them campaigning as either independent or temperance candidates.

The Ontario Liberal Party, led by Newton Rowell, formed the official opposition.

Independent Labour MLA Allan Studholme was re-elected in Hamilton East. He had held the seat since a 1906 by-election.

The campaign was seen to turn more significantly on the matter of Regulation 17 (which limited instruction in French-language Catholic separate schools), in comparison to temperance issues, and that worked against the Liberals, who placed Prohibition of sales in bars and clubs as a main plank in their platform.

Expansion of the Legislative Assembly

An Act passed prior to the election expanded the number of members from 106 to 111, and the number of ridings from 103 to 107. The following changes were made:

 Windsor was spun off from Essex North
 Monck was merged with Lincoln, and St. Catharines was withdrawn
 Niagara Falls was withdrawn from Welland
 Cochrane was carved out from Timiskaming
 In Bruce County, the three ridings were reorganized:
 The Township of Kinloss was withdrawn from Bruce South
 Bruce North gained the Township of Elderslie, while those of Bruce and Saugeen were withdrawn
 As a consequence, Bruce Centre was reconstituted as Bruce West
 In Victoria County, Victoria East and Victoria West were reorganized into Victoria North and Victoria South
 In Toronto, the ridings of Toronto East, Toronto North, Toronto South and Toronto West were replaced:
 Toronto Northeast, Toronto Northwest, Toronto Southeast and Toronto Southwest were constituted as two-member constituencies
 Parkdale and Riverdale were created as single-member constituencies

The Patricia Portion acquired in 1912 was divided between Cochrane and Kenora.

Results

|-
! colspan=2 rowspan=2 | Political party
! rowspan=2 | Party leader
! colspan=5 | MPPs
! colspan=3 | Votes
|-
! Candidates
!1911
!Dissol.
!1914
!±
!#
!%
! ± (pp)

|style="text-align:left;"|James P. Whitney
|109
|82
|
|84
|2
|268,548
|54.02%
|1.57

|style="text-align:left;"|Newton Rowell
|90
|22
|
|24
|2
|186,168
|37.45%
|1.06

|style="text-align:left;"|
|4
|1
|
|1
|
|6,535
|1.31%
|1.12

|style="text-align:left;"|
|2
|–
|–
|1
|1
|2,236
|0.45%
|
|-
|style="background:#FF00FF;" rowspan="4"| 
|style="text-align:left;"|Temperance
|style="text-align:left;"|
|9
|–
|–
|–
|
|13,064
|2.63%
|
|-
|style="text-align:left;"|Liberal-Temperance
|style="text-align:left;"|
|1
|–
|–
|1
|1
|2,733
|0.55%
|
|-
|style="text-align:left;"|Conservative-Temperance
|style="text-align:left;"|
|2
|–
|–
|–
|
|2,222
|0.45%
|0.02
|-
|style="text-align:left;"|Prohibitionist
|style="text-align:left;"|
|1
|–
|–
|–
|
|1,302
|0.26%
|

|style="text-align:left;"|
|
|1
|
|–
|1
|colspan="3"|Did not campaign

|style="text-align:left;"|
|5
|–
|–
|–
|
|4,837
|0.97%
|0.07

|style="text-align:left;"|
|12
|–
|–
|–
|
|4,532
|0.91%
|0.04

|style="text-align:left;"|
|4
|–
|–
|–
|
|4,270
|0.86%
|0.11

|style="text-align:left;"|
|1
|–
|–
|–
|
|691
|0.14%
|

|colspan="3"|
|
|colspan="5"|
|-style="background:#E9E9E9;"
|colspan="3" style="text-align:left;"|Total
|240
|106
|106
|111
|
|497,138
|100.00%
|
|-
|colspan="8" style="text-align:left;"|Blank and invalid ballots
|align="right"|7,304
|style="background:#E9E9E9;" colspan="2"|
|-style="background:#E9E9E9;"
|colspan="8" style="text-align:left;"|Registered voters / turnout
|697,935
|72.28%
|8.02
|}

Results summary by region

Reorganization of ridings
The newly created ridings returned the following MLAs:

Seats that changed hands

There were 20 seats that changed allegiance in the election:

Liberal to Conservative
Bruce South
Grey North
Haldimand
Lambton East
Middlesex East
Ontario South
Oxford South
Wentworth North

Liberal to Independent-Liberal
Prescott

 Liberal-Conservative to Conservative
Rainy River

 Conservative to Liberal
Brant
Brant South
Essex South
Middlesex North
Ottawa East
Ottawa West
Peterborough West
Prince Edward

 Conservative to Liberal-Temperance
Wellington South

Acclamations

When nominations closed, three candidates were acclaimed. A later withdrawal in Kenora enabled the acclamation of Harold Arthur Clement Machin.

Forbes Godfrey (York West) was acclaimed because the Liberal candidate was held to have missed the deadline by one minute. In Wellington East, the Liberals opted not to press a similar case against the Conservative candidate, whose nomination papers were filed 90 minutes after the deadline.

See also
Politics of Ontario
list of Ontario political parties
Premier of Ontario
Leader of the Opposition (Ontario)

References

Further reading
 

1914 elections in Canada
1914
1914 in Ontario
June 1914 events